Last Chance Canyon is a canyon in the El Paso Mountains near Johannesburg, California. The canyon runs from Saltdale in the south to Black Mountain in the north; part of it lies within Red Rock Canyon State Park. The canyon includes a variety of archaeological sites, including pictographs, villages, rock shelters, mills, and quarries. Historic sites such as gold mining camps are also located in the canyon.

The canyon is owned by the U.S. Bureau of Land Management and is open for recreational use. Hiking, camping, and 4-wheel drive vehicles are permitted in most parts of the canyon.

The canyon was added to the National Register of Historic Places on December 5, 1972.

Gallery

References

External links
Friends of Last Chance Canyon

Mojave Desert
Canyons and gorges of California
Landforms of Kern County, California
History of the Mojave Desert region
Historic districts on the National Register of Historic Places in California
National Register of Historic Places in Kern County, California
Archaeological sites on the National Register of Historic Places in California